"Satisfy You", released on October 13, 1999, is a number-one R&B single by American hip-hop artist and producer Puff Daddy and features vocals by American R&B singer-songwriter R. Kelly on the hook. The song spent six weeks at number one on the U.S. R&B chart and peaked at number two on the Billboard Hot 100 chart for three weeks behind "Smooth" by Santana featuring Rob Thomas. The song was co-written by both Combs and R. Kelly, with additional writing by R&B singer Kelly Price, who performs backing vocals. The song's beat and bassline is taken from "I Got 5 on It" by Luniz, which itself interpolates Club Nouveau's "Why You Treat Me So Bad" among others. In contrast to the original song's subject matter, which is about marijuana. The song is about satisfying the significant other. The song garnered a nomination for Best Rap Performance by a Duo or Group at the 42nd Grammy Awards in 2000.

Music video 
The music video's main story shows the rapper walking in on his girlfriend cheating on him with another man. The music video then shows R. Kelly and Puff Daddy singing the chorus in a valley and mountain desert area. The video was directed by Hype Williams.

Remixes
The song has 2 official remixes. The first remix features a new beat, two new verses by Puff Daddy, a verse by Lil' Kim, and vocals by Mario Winans. The second remix is the West Coast Remix features the original beat, verses by the Luniz, vocals by R. Kelly, and a new verse, intro, and outro by Puff Daddy.

Charts

Weekly charts

Year-end charts

Certifications

See also
List of Hot R&B Singles & Tracks number ones of 1999

References

1999 singles
1999 songs
Sean Combs songs
R. Kelly songs
Music videos directed by Hype Williams
Songs written by Sean Combs
Songs written by R. Kelly
Songs written by Denzil Foster
Songs written by Thomas McElroy
Bad Boy Records singles